Selaginella pulcherrima is a species of plant in the family Selaginellaceae.

References
 GBIF entry

pulcherrima